Big Air is a snowboarding video game developed by Pitbull Syndicate and published by Accolade for the PlayStation.

Reception

The game received "mixed" reviews according to the review aggregation website GameRankings.

References

External links
 

1999 video games
Accolade (company) games
PlayStation (console) games
PlayStation (console)-only games
Snowboarding video games
Video games developed in the United Kingdom